The Walt Disney World Swan is a resort hotel located between Epcot and Disney's Hollywood Studios in the Walt Disney World Resort in Bay Lake, Florida, and across from its sister resort, the Walt Disney World Dolphin. Both hotels were designed by Michael Graves, and are connected by a palm-tree lined covered walkway crossing a lagoon. The Swan opened on January 13, 1990, as part of a joint venture between the Walt Disney Company, Tishman Hotel Corporation, MetLife and Starwood Hotels and Resorts, which was merged into Marriott International in 2019. The land the resort occupies is owned by the Walt Disney Company and leased on a 99-year term to the Tishman Hotel Corporation and MetLife who own the buildings and contract the operation to Marriott International under the Westin Hotels & Resorts brand. The Walt Disney World Swan and Dolphin are a part of the Walt Disney Collection of resorts; because of this they are Disney branded and guests of the resort have access to special Disney benefits available to Disney Resort Hotel guests only.

The Dolphin and Swan share similar elements, but each has a distinctive appearance. The colored facade is adorned with turquoise waves similar to the Dolphin's banana-leaf motif.

In 2008, The Walt Disney Swan Resort was awarded a One Palm Designation through the Florida Green Lodging Program established by the Florida Department of Environmental Protection. The Florida Green Lodging Program is a voluntary state initiative that provides the lodging industry with free technical assistance, encouraging hotels and motels to adopt cost-saving “green” practices that reduce waste, conserve natural resources and improve the bottom line.

History
In the late 1980s, Disney saw that they were losing business to area hotels that catered to conventions and large meetings, so Michael Eisner decided to build a convention-oriented hotel near Epcot. The Tishman Group, the contractor who was hired to build Epcot and who also had hotels in the nearby Disney hotel zone, claimed that the Epcot deal gave them exclusive rights to operate convention hotels on the Disney property, so Disney partnered with Tishman to develop the Swan and Dolphin complex. The Swan was managed by Westin Hotels & Resorts, and the Dolphin by Sheraton Hotels & Resorts. Eisner had used Graves for other company projects and wanted to continue to build striking, unique buildings.

Tishman and MetLife own the buildings, but have a 99-year lease on the land from Disney. Disney also receives a share of the hotel's revenues, and has a say in any design or architecture changes to the interior or exterior of the buildings. In November 2021 a new extension to the hotel was opened, called Walt Disney World Swan Reserve. The new property is located across the street from the main hotel and contains 349 rooms including 151 suites.

Location
The Walt Disney Swan Resort is located near many Disney hotspots and hotels. Walking paths or Disney boats are available from the resort to both Epcot and Disney's Hollywood Studios. Buses contracted by the hotel bring guests to all other Walt Disney World attractions.

Amenities

The resort, along with the Walt Disney World Dolphin Resort, has two lap pools and one grotto pool with a waterslide and waterfall. Drinks can be ordered by guests near the pools through a nearby cabana bar. Resort guests have access to a spa, arcade, day care program, along with multiple Disney gift shops.

Dining

Fine dining 

 Il Mulino New York Trattoria - Italian
 Kimonos - Sushi

Casual dining 

 Garden Grove - American
 Splash Pool Bar and Grill - Poolside

Quick service 

 Java - Coffee and Food

 Chill - Frozen drinks

Lounges 

 Il Mulino Lounge
 Kimonos Lounge

Former Dining
Palio - Italian

Walt Disney World privileges
Walt Disney World Swan guests are provided complimentary transportation to all Walt Disney World theme parks and attractions on the Disney Transportation System, via boat (to Epcot and Disney's Hollywood Studios). Length-of-stay park passes are available, as is package delivery from Disney theme park shops to the resort. There is a Walt Disney World guest services desk located in the lobby of each resort. Walt Disney World Swan guests can also use Early Theme Park Access, and begin booking Genie+ selections at 7:00am by linking their reservation to the My Disney Experience mobile app. However, room charging (using hotel key as a credit card at Walt Disney World) is not available and hotel restaurants do not participate in the Disney Dining Plan. For an additional fee, the hotel features onsite Disney Character Dining nightly and on weekend mornings, and reservations for all restaurants can be made through Disney.

References

External links
Photo Gallery of Swan & Dolphin Hotel by Michael Graves
Walt Disney World Swan & Dolphin official website
Walt Disney World Swan Resort page at Westin Hotels website
Walt Disney World Swan Resort page at Walt Disney World website

Hotels in Walt Disney World Resort
Hotel buildings completed in 1990
Hotels established in 1990
Michael Graves buildings
Convention centers in Florida
1990 establishments in Florida